Tōjō, Tojo or Toujou (written: ,  or ) is a Japanese surname. Notable people with the surname include:

, Japanese manga artist
, Japanese-Canadian chef
, Japanese politician, general and Prime Minister of Japan during World War II
, Japanese voice actress
, Japanese voice actress
, Japanese football referee
, Japanese footballer
, Japanese baseball player
Takashi Tojo, Japanese mixed martial artist
, Japanese footballer
, Japanese ultra-nationalist politician and granddaughter of Hideki Tojo

Fictional characters
, a character in the video game Danganronpa V3: Killing Harmony
, a character in the light novel series High School DxD
, a character in the media franchise Love Live!

Japanese-language surnames